Anastasia Sergeyevna Kirillova (born 20 February 1996) is a Belarusian cross-country skier. She competed in the women's sprint at the 2018 Winter Olympics.

Cross-country skiing results
All results are sourced from the International Ski Federation (FIS).

Olympic Games

World Championships

World Cup

Season standings

References

External links
 

1996 births
Living people
Belarusian female cross-country skiers
Olympic cross-country skiers of Belarus
Cross-country skiers at the 2018 Winter Olympics
Place of birth missing (living people)
Paralympic sighted guides